Madurai South may refer to:
 Madurai-South taluk
 Madurai South (state assembly constituency)